Colletes compactus is a species of ground-nesting bee in the genus Colletes.

References

Colletidae
Insects described in 1868